Liu Faqing (born June 1964) is a lieutenant general (zhongjiang) of the People's Liberation Army (PLA). He has been serving as Secretary-General of National Defense Mobilization Commission since December 2021, and formerly served as deputy commander of the People's Liberation Army Ground Force and formerly served as commander of the People's Liberation Army Air Force Airborne Corps. Liu was promoted to the rank of major general (shaojiang) in December 2014 and lieutenant general (zhongjiang) in December 2019.

Biography
Liu was born in Yanshi, Henan in June 1964. He enlisted in the People's Liberation Army (PLA) in October 1982. He served in the People's Liberation Army Air Force Airborne Corps for a long time, where he was promoted to become its commander in March 2017. In October 2018, he was promoted again to become deputy commander of the People's Liberation Army Ground Force.

Liu is an alternate member of the 19th Central Committee of the Communist Party of China.

References 

1964 births
People from Yanshi
Living people
Frunze Military Academy alumni
People's Liberation Army generals from Henan